Massey Fucking Hall is a live album by Canadian rock band Japandroids, released on June 26, 2020 by ANTI-. It was recorded on October 24, 2017 at Massey Hall in Toronto during the Near to the Wild Heart of Life Tour.

Background
Japandroids' third album, Near to the Wild Heart of Life, was released on January 27, 2017. The band toured heavily in support of the album, performing over 150 shows in 23 countries between October 2016 and October 2018.

On October 24, 2017, roughly halfway through the Near to the Wild Heart of Life Tour, their show at Massey Hall in Toronto was filmed and recorded for the concert film series Live At Massey Hall. The film was released on June 14, 2018.

Release
On May 27, 2020, Japandroids announced that their first live album Massey Fucking Hall would be released by Anti- on June 19, 2020 (digital) and October 2, 2020 (vinyl). The announcement came during the height of the COVID-19 pandemic, when virtually all live concerts and music festivals across North America were either canceled or postponed. On the timing of the release, drummer David Prowse stated:

On June 10, 2020, it was announced that the digital release date had been pushed back to June 26, 2020 out of respect for  Juneteenth, with the band stating that they "didn't want to take up space on such an important day".

Reception
Massey Fucking Hall was met with "generally favorable" reviews from critics. At Metacritic, which assigns a weighted average rating out of 100 to reviews from mainstream publications, this release received an average score of 68, based on 5 reviews. Aggregator Album of the Year gave the album a 72 out of 100 based on a critical consensus of 8 reviews.

Track listing

Personnel
Japandroids
 Brian King – guitar, lead vocals
 David Prowse – drums, backup vocals

References

2020 live albums
Japandroids albums
Anti- (record label) albums